Honor a Quien Honor Merece (English 'Honor Whom Honor Deserves) is the 16th studio album by the Mexican pop singer Mijares. This album is a tribute to José José and it was released 2005. It has earned a Gold and Platinum disc.

Track listing
 "El Triste"
 "Almohada"
 "Preso"
 "Si Me Dejas Ahora"
 "Me Basta"
 "Desesperado"
 "El Amar y el Querer"
 "Gavilán o Paloma"
 "Volcán"
 "Una Noche de Amor"
 "Vamos a Darnos Tiempo"
 "La Nave del Olvido"

References

2005 albums
Manuel Mijares albums
José José tribute albums
Spanish-language albums